Arne Anders Vilhem Helander (born 8 February 1941 in Helsinki), is a Finnish architect and was Professor of Architecture History at Helsinki University of Technology, Espoo, Finland from 1986 until 2005, when he became professor emeritus.

Helander qualified as an architect in 1967, and completed a further Licentiate degree in architecture in 1972. He had been teaching in Helsinki University of Technology, in the position of teaching assistant already since 1963, while still studying, and was an "acting professor" in 1968-69.

In addition to his teaching work, Helander has also worked as an architect. He has had his own office since 1968, but has been in partnership with architect Juha Leiviskä since 1978, their firm being called Vilhelm Helander, Juha Leiviskä arkkitehdit SAFA.

Helander first came to public prominence with the polemical book Kenen Helsinki? (Whose Helsinki?) (1970), written jointly with architect Mikael Sundman. This was a period when the building rights for many urban centres in Finland had been raised, allowing both owners and property developers to build larger buildings, the consequence of which was the destruction of much of the old urban fabric. In many cases, the historic facades were preserved and new buildings with denser areas were built behind them. Helander and Sundman's book was one of the first publications to bring the destruction of the historical Helsinki to public attention. One of the main examples was the development of the neoclassical Helsinki City Hall being vastly modified by architect Aarno Ruusuvuori. The book was awarded the prestigious Eino Leino Prize in 1971.

Helander went on to specialise in building conservation, both in teaching and in practice. Helander has also written widely on the subject of the history of Finnish architecture.

Helander is a member of the Finnish Association of Architects. He has been a member of a number of boards, including the Alvar Aalto Foundation (1997-2006), and the City of Helsinki city building inspection commission (1976–79, 1982–85).

He is married to Elisabeth Helander, Director of Community Initiatives and Innovative Actions of the Directorate-General for Regional Policy of the European Commission.

A select list of building conservation and conversion works by Vilhelm Helander 

Old Students' House, Helsinki (1978–80)
Suomenlinna Fortress island, Helsinki (1977; 2005–09)
School, kindergarten and clubhouse in Katajanokka, Helsinki (1980–85)
Finnish National Museum, Helsinki (1993-2000, 2016-)
Helsinki Cathedral, Helsinki (1995–99)
House of the Estates, Helsinki (1985–93)
Pori Town Hall (2000–08)
Porvoo museums (2003–09)
Good Shepherd Church, Pakila, Helsinki, restoration and extension (by Juha Leiviskä) (2002)

Awards 
Helander was awarded the European Gold Medal for the Preservation of Historical Monuments in 1998; and the Pro-Finlandia Medal in 1998.

References
Vilhelm Helander, Modern Architecture in Finland, Kirjayhtymä, Helsinki, 1995.
Vilhelm Helander and Mikael Sundman, Kenen Helsinki - raportti kantakaupungista, Porvoo, 1970. [in Finnish]
Vilhelm Helander, "Brick - Wood - Iron - Concrete. Early co-operation between architects and engineers in Finland",  Innovations; Architect and Engineer. Seminar at Helsinki University of Technology, Nov. 26-27, 2009.

1941 births
Living people
Architects from Helsinki
Finnish architecture writers
Neoclassical architecture in Finland
Recipients of the Eino Leino Prize